Darlton D. Cooper (August 2, 1902 – February 13, 1944), nicknamed "Dolly", was an American Negro league pitcher between 1923 and 1940.

A native of Arkadelphia, Arkansas, Cooper was the brother of fellow Negro leaguer Anthony Cooper. Older brother Darltie made his Negro leagues debut in 1923 with the Indianapolis ABCs, and ended his long career with the Newark Eagles in 1940. Cooper died in Schenectady, New York in 1944 at age 41.

References

External links
 and Baseball-Reference Black Baseball stats and Seamheads
 Darltie Cooper at Arkansas Baseball Encyclopedia

1902 births
1944 deaths
Bacharach Giants players
Baltimore Black Sox players
Harrisburg Giants players
Hilldale Club players
Homestead Grays players
Indianapolis ABCs players
Newark Eagles players
Washington Pilots players
Baseball pitchers
Baseball players from Arkansas
People from Arkadelphia, Arkansas
20th-century African-American sportspeople